Ingo Walter is a professor of finance, corporate governance and ethics as well as Vice Dean of Faculty at New York University's Stern School of Business.

Academic Interests
Walter researches and consults in the areas of international trade policy, international banking, environmental economics, and economics of multinational corporate operations.

Professor Walter received his A.B. and M.S. degrees from Lehigh University, and his Ph.D. degree in 1966 from New York University. He taught at the University of Missouri - St. Louis from 1965 to 1970 and has been on the faculty at New York University since 1970. He held a joint appointment as Professor of International Management at INSEAD from 1986 to 2005 and remains a visiting professor there.

He currently teaches "Sovereign and Reputational Risk" in the Risk Management Open Enrollment program for Stern Executive Education.  He teaches for the TRIUM Global Executive MBA Program, an alliance of NYU Stern, the London School of Economics and HEC School of Management.  Professor Walter also teaches for, and is the Academic Director of, both the Master of Science in Global Finance (MSGF) and Master of Science in Risk Management Program for Executives (MSRM).  MSGF is jointly offered by NYU Stern and the Hong Kong University of Science and Technology. MSRM  is offered by NYU Stern.

Books
Walter is the author, co-author, or editor of 26 books, including:

References

External links
NYU Stern Executive Education
Ingo Walter's profile at NYU Stern School of Business
TRIUM Global Executive MBA Program
Master of Science in Global Finance
Master of Science in Risk Management Program for Executives 

Year of birth missing (living people)
Living people
American economists
New York University faculty
American ethicists